Samuel Shaw (Ulysses) Arentz (January 8, 1879 – June 17, 1934) was a United States representative from Nevada. A Republican, he served 10 years in Congress.

Biography 

Arentz was born in Chicago, Illinois, on January 8, 1879. He graduated from the Chicago Manual Training School in 1897 and from the South Dakota School of Mines at Rapid City in 1904. He was a member of the South Dakota National Guard at Rapid City from 1901 to 1904. He moved to Ludering, Nevada, in 1907, and to Salt Lake City, Utah, in 1912. He was engaged as surveyor, assessor, miner, and timberman in Bear Gulch and Butte, of Montana; the Bingham Canyon and Stockton, Utah; and the Lake Superior copper country, mining engineer and superintendent of mines in Idaho, Utah, Arizona, and Nevada. He also served as the chief engineer of railway companies in Nevada; a consulting engineer of the United States Bureau of Mines; a captain of Engineers, United States Army, during the First World War; and moved to a ranch in Lyon County, Nevada, near Simpson, in 1917. He was also engaged in mining and irrigation projects;

He was elected as a Republican to the Sixty-seventh Congress (March 4, 1921 to March 3, 1923). He was not renominated, and was an unsuccessful candidate in the 1922 Republican primary election for United States Senator. He was again elected as At-Large Representative from the Sixty-ninth to the three succeeding Congresses (March 4, 1925 to March 3, 1933). Arentz was an unsuccessful candidate for reelection in 1932 to the Seventy-third Congress. He was a delegate to the Republican National Conventions in 1928 and 1932, and again engaged as a rancher near Simpson. He also resumed mining activities in Nevada and Utah.

Arentz died in Reno, Nevada, where he had gone to receive medical treatment, on June 17, 1934. He is interred in Mountain View Cemetery in Reno, Nevada.

References

External links

Our Campaigns

1879 births
1934 deaths
20th-century American engineers
20th-century American politicians
United States Army personnel of World War I
United States Army Corps of Engineers personnel
American mining engineers
American surveyors
People from Lyon County, Nevada
Politicians from Chicago
Republican Party members of the United States House of Representatives from Nevada
South Dakota School of Mines and Technology alumni
United States Bureau of Mines personnel
Military personnel from Illinois